The London Regional Transport Act 1984 (1984 c. 32) was an Act of the United Kingdom Parliament which created the statutory corporation named London Regional Transport. It received royal assent on 26 June 1984, and its major provisions took effect on 29 June.

Later legislation has modified the effects of this Act.

Amendments and repeals

The London Regional Transport (Penalty Fares) Act 1992 repealed sections 54 to 58.

References

United Kingdom Acts of Parliament 1984
Railway Acts
Acts of the Parliament of the United Kingdom concerning London
Defunct transport authorities in London
1984 in London
1984 in transport
Transport policy in the United Kingdom
Transport legislation
History of transport in the United Kingdom